Carl Allanmore Murchison (1887–1961) was an American psychologist and an early promoter of the discipline of psychology. Unlike most psychologists who became prominent in the history books, Murchison was not an influential theorist or researcher. Instead, he was an extremely active organizer, publisher, and editor.

Murchison received his Ph.D. in social psychology from Johns Hopkins University in 1923. He taught at Clark University from 1923 to 1936. During most of this time he served as the chair of the psychology department.

Carl Murchison edited The Psychological Register in 1929, and the first Handbook of Social Psychology in 1935. He founded and served as editor of a total of five psychology journals, all of which still exist today. These include the Journal of Psychology, the Journal of General Psychology, co-founded with Edward Titchener and the Journal of Social Psychology, co-founded with John Dewey.

References

Clark University faculty
20th-century American psychologists
1961 deaths
1887 births